Jean Marchand,  (December 20, 1918 – August 28, 1988) was a French Canadian public figure, trade unionist and politician in Quebec, Canada.

Life and career
During the 1949 Asbestos Strike in Quebec, Marchand led the striking workers as secretary of the Catholic Workers Confederation of Canada (CCCL). It was during this time that he met Pierre Trudeau. Marchand was approached to be a Liberal candidate in the federal election of 1963, but disagreements scuttled a run that year.

In the 1965 federal election, Marchand along with Gérard Pelletier and Pierre Trudeau, were persuaded to run as Liberal candidates. Dubbed the "Three Wise Men" in English, and les trois colombes (three doves) in French, they were seen as destined to shake Canadian politics. Trudeau and Pelletier were provided "safe" ridings in Montreal while Marchand won a hard fight in Quebec City for his riding. Marchand was given a post in the government of Prime Minister Lester B. Pearson promptly after winning the election. Under Pearson, he was appointed Minister of Citizenship and Immigration, and later of Manpower and Immigration by Prime Minister Pearson.

After Charles de Gaulle's infamous cry of "Vive le Québec Libre", the Cabinet met to decide the response. The French-speaking ministers, led by Jean Marchand, wanted Prime Minister Pearson to tell de Gaulle to go home. The English-speaking ministers, on the other hand, did not want to go that far: a public rebuke was sufficient.

When Pearson retired in 1968, Marchand was seen as the most likely and strongest Quebec candidate to replace him as Liberal leader and Prime Minister.  However, he declined, claiming that his English was not good enough. It then fell upon Trudeau to make a credible run by a French Canadian for the leadership of the Liberal party.  Trudeau won the Liberal leadership and the 1968 federal election.

Under Trudeau he held many senior portfolios. He was Minister of Forestry and Rural Development from 1968 to 1969, Minister of Regional Economic Expansion from 1969 to 1972, Minister of Transport from 1972 to 1975, a Minister without portfolio from 1975 to 1976, and Minister of the Environment in 1976.

In October 1976, he resigned his seat in the House of Commons over a disagreement with the government's position regarding the use of the French language by air traffic controllers in Quebec.  Presenting himself as an opponent of the separatist program of the Parti Québécois, he stood as a Quebec Liberal Party candidate in the 1976 Quebec provincial election in the riding of Louis-Hébert but was defeated by Claude Morin of the PQ in an election that resulted in the Parti Québécois forming its first government.

One month after his defeat, Marchand was appointed to the Senate by Trudeau and became Speaker of the Senate of Canada in 1980. He resigned from the upper house in December 1983 in order to accept an appointment as president of the Canadian Transport Commission. Marchand was appointed a Companion of the Order of Canada in 1986.

External links
 
Order of Canada Citation
Jean Marchand fonds, Library and Archives Canada. 

1918 births
1988 deaths
Canadian Ministers of Transport
Companions of the Order of Canada
Canadian senators from Quebec
Liberal Party of Canada MPs
Liberal Party of Canada senators
Members of the House of Commons of Canada from Quebec
Members of the King's Privy Council for Canada
Quebec lieutenants
Speakers of the Senate of Canada
Trade unionists from Quebec
Université Laval alumni
Confédération des syndicats nationaux